This is a list of land weapons used by the Hellenic Army or Greek army during World War II.

Rifles 

 Mannlicher–Schönauer
 Gras M1874/14
 Berthier M1916
 Lebel M1886/93
 Steyr-Mannlicher M1895
 FN Model 30

Sidearms 

 Ruby pistol
 FN Model 1922
 FN M1910
 FN M1900
 FN M1903
 Colt M1907 Army Special
 Mannlicher M1901
 Chamelot-Delvigne M1873
 Colt M1927 Official Police
 Nagant M1895
 Bergmann Bayard M1908

Machine guns

Heavy machine guns 

 Hotchkiss Mle 1914 machine gun
 St. Étienne Mle 1907
 Schwarzlose M1907/12

Light machine guns 

 Hotchkiss M1922 machine gun
 Chauchat
 EPK M1939

See also 

 List of Greek military equipment of World War II

References

Hellenic Army
World War II weapons of Greece